V for Vendetta is a British graphic novel written by Alan Moore and illustrated by David Lloyd (with additional art by Tony Weare). Initially published between 1982 and 1985 in black and white as an ongoing serial in the British anthology Warrior, its serialization was completed in 1988–89 in a ten-issue colour limited series published by DC Comics in the United States. Subsequent collected editions were typically published under DC's specialized imprint, Vertigo, until that label was shut down in 2018. Since then it has been transferred to DC Black Label. The story depicts a dystopian and post-apocalyptic near-future history version of the United Kingdom in the 1990s, preceded by a nuclear war in the 1980s that devastated most of the rest of the world. The Nordic supremacist, neo-fascist, outwardly Christofascistic, and homophobic fictional Norsefire political party has exterminated its opponents in concentration camps, and now rules the country as a police state.

The comics follow the story's title character and protagonist, V, an anarchist revolutionary dressed in a Guy Fawkes mask, as he begins an elaborate and theatrical revolutionist campaign to kill his former captors, bring down the fascist state, and convince the people to abandon fascism in favour of anarchy, while inspiring a young woman, Evey Hammond, to be his protégée.

DC Comics sold more than 500,000 copies of the graphic novel in the United States by 2006. Warner Bros. released a film adaptation of the same name, written and co-produced by the Wachowskis, in 2005. Following the first and second season premieres of Gotham prequel television series Pennyworth in 2019 and 2020, showrunners Danny Cannon and Bruno Heller confirmed the series would also serve as a prequel to V for Vendetta, with the series' British Civil War eventually giving way to the Norsefire government and rise of V, and the third season featuring predecessors to V wearing Guy Fawkes masks.

Publication history

The first episodes of V for Vendetta appeared in black-and-white between 1982 and 1985, in Warrior, a British anthology comic published by Quality Communications. The strip was one of the least popular in that title; editor/publisher Dez Skinn remarked, "If I'd have given each character their own title, the failures would have certainly outweighed the successes, with the uncompromising 'V for Vendetta' probably being an early casualty. But with five or six strips an issue, regular [readers] only needed two or three favorites to justify their buying the title."

When the publishers cancelled Warrior in 1985 (with two completed issues unpublished due to the cancellation), several companies attempted to convince Moore and Lloyd to let them publish and complete the story. In 1988, DC Comics published a ten-issue series that reprinted the Warrior stories in colour, then continued the series to completion. The first new material appeared in issue No. 7, which included the unpublished episodes that would have appeared in Warrior No. 27 and No. 28. Tony Weare drew one chapter ("Vincent") and contributed additional art to two others ("Valerie" and "The Vacation"); Steve Whitaker and Siobhan Dodds worked as colourists on the entire series.

Collected editions
The entire series has appeared collected in paperback and hardback form, including Moore's "Behind the Painted Smile" essay and two "interludes" outside the central continuity. Later collections include reissued paperbacks, published in the US by DC's Vertigo imprint and in the UK by Titan Books. A new hardback edition was published in 2005 featuring improved printing and coloring. In August 2009 DC published a slipcased Absolute Edition; this includes newly coloured "silent art" pages (full-page panels containing no dialogue) from the series' original run, which have not previously appeared in any previous collected edition.

Background
David Lloyd's paintings for V for Vendetta in Warrior first appeared in black and white.

In writing V for Vendetta, Moore drew upon a comic strip idea submission that the DC Thomson scriptwriting competition rejected in 1975: "The Doll", which involved a transgender terrorist in white face makeup, who fought a totalitarian state during the 1980s.

Years later, Skinn reportedly invited Moore to create a dark mystery strip with artist David Lloyd. V for Vendetta was intended to recreate something similar to their popular Marvel UK Night Raven strip in a 1930s noir. They chose against doing historical research and instead set the story in the near future rather than the recent past.

Then V for Vendetta emerged, putting the emphasis on "V" rather than "Vendetta". David Lloyd developed the idea of dressing V as Guy Fawkes after previous designs followed the conventional superhero look. During the preparation of the story, Moore made a list of what he wanted to bring into the plot, which he reproduced in "Behind the Painted Smile":Orwell. Huxley. Thomas Disch. Judge Dredd. Harlan Ellison's "Repent, Harlequin!" Said the Ticktockman, Catman and The Prowler in the City at the Edge of the World by the same author. Vincent Price's Dr. Phibes and Theatre of Blood. David Bowie. The Shadow. Night Raven. Batman. Fahrenheit 451. The writings of the New Worlds school of science fiction. Max Ernst's painting "Europe After the Rain". Thomas Pynchon. The atmosphere of British Second World War films. The Prisoner. Robin Hood. Dick Turpin... The influence of such a wide number of references has been thoroughly demonstrated in academic studies, above which dystopian elements stand out, especially the similarity with George Orwell's Nineteen Eighty-Four in several stages of the plot.

The political climate of Britain in the early 1980s also influenced the work, with Moore positing that Margaret Thatcher's Conservative government would "obviously lose the 1983 elections", and that an incoming Michael Foot-led Labour government, committed to complete nuclear disarmament, would allow the United Kingdom to escape relatively unscathed after a limited nuclear war. However, Moore felt that fascists would quickly subvert a post-holocaust Britain. V, an anarchist, initially murders members of the fascist government, but as the story develops, Moore deliberately made V's actions "very, very morally ambiguous" with the aim that "I didn't want to tell people what to think, I just wanted to tell people to think."

Moore's scenario remains untested. Addressing historical developments when DC reissued the work, he noted:Naïveté can also be detected in my supposition that it would take something as melodramatic as a near-miss nuclear conflict to nudge Britain towards fascism... The simple fact that much of the historical background of the story proceeds from a predicted Conservative defeat in the 1983 General Election should tell you how reliable we were in our roles as Cassandras.

Plot

Book 1: Europe After the Reign
On Guy Fawkes Night in London in 1997, a financially desperate 16-year-old, Evey Hammond, sexually solicits men who are actually members of the state secret police, called "The Finger". Preparing to rape and kill her, the Fingermen are dispatched by V, a cloaked anarchist wearing a mask, who later remotely detonates explosives at the Palace of Westminster before bringing Evey to his contraband-filled underground lair, the "Shadow Gallery." Evey tells V her life story, which reveals her own past and England's recent history. During a dispute over Poland in the late 1980s, the Soviet Union and the United States, under the presidency of Ted Kennedy, entered a global nuclear war which left continental Europe and Africa uninhabitable. Although Britain itself was not bombed due to the Labour government's decision to remove American nuclear missiles, it faced environmental devastation and famine due to the nuclear winter. After a period of lawlessness in which Evey's mother died, the remaining corporations and fascist groups took over England and formed a new totalitarian government, Norsefire. Evey's father, a former socialist, was arrested by the regime.

Meanwhile, Eric Finch, a veteran detective in charge of the regular police force ("The Nose"), begins investigating V's terrorist activities. Finch often communicates with the other top government officials, collectively known as "The Head." These individuals include Derek Almond, who supervises the Finger, and Adam Susan, the reclusive Leader of Norsefire, who obsessively oversees the government's Fate computer system. Finch's case thickens when V kidnaps Lewis Prothero, a propaganda-broadcasting radio personality, and drives him into a mental breakdown by forcing him to relive his actions as the commander of a "resettlement" camp near Larkhill with his treasured doll collection as inmates. Evey agrees to help V with his next assassination by disguising herself as a child prostitute to infiltrate the home of Bishop Anthony Lilliman, a paedophile priest, whom V forces to commit suicide by eating a poisoned communion wafer. He prepares to murder Dr. Delia Surridge, a medical researcher who once had a romance with Finch. Finch suddenly discovers the connection among V's three targets: they all used to work at Larkhill. That night, V kills both Almond and Surridge. Surridge leaves a diary revealing that V—a former inmate and victim of Surridge's cruel medical experiments—destroyed and fled the camp and is now eliminating the camp's former officers for what they did. Finch reports these findings to Susan, and suspects that this vendetta may actually be a cover for V, who, he worries, may be plotting an even bigger terrorist attack.

Book 2: This Vicious Cabaret
Four months later, V breaks into Jordan Tower, the home of Norsefire's propaganda department, "the Mouth"—led by Roger Dascombe—to broadcast a speech that calls on the people to resist the government. V escapes using an elaborate diversion that results in Dascombe's death. Finch is soon introduced to Peter Creedy, the Finger's new head, who provokes Finch to strike him and thus get sent on a forced vacation. Evey takes shelter at the house of a man named Gordon, who found her on the street. While originally platonic, they eventually build a romantic relationship. Evey and Gordon unknowingly cross paths with Rose Almond, the widow of the recently killed Derek. After Derek's death, Rose had reluctantly begun a relationship with Dascombe. With both of her lovers murdered, she is forced to perform demoralizing burlesque work, increasing her hatred of the unsupportive government.

When a Scottish gangster named Ally Harper murders Gordon, a vengeful Evey interrupts a meeting between Harper and Creedy, the latter of whom is buying the support of Harper's thugs in preparation for a coup d'état. Evey attempts to shoot Harper but is suddenly abducted and then imprisoned. Amidst interrogation and torture, Evey finds an old letter hidden in her cell by an inmate named Valerie Page, a film actress who was imprisoned and executed for being a lesbian and documented her experiences in the letter.

Evey's interrogator finally gives her a choice of collaboration or death; inspired by Valerie's letter, Evey refuses to collaborate and, expecting to be executed, is instead told that she is free. Stunned, Evey learns that her supposed imprisonment is a hoax constructed by V so that she could experience an ordeal similar to the one that shaped him at Larkhill. He reveals that Valerie was a real Larkhill prisoner who died in the cell next to his and that the letter is not a fake. Evey forgives V, who has hacked into the government's Fate computer system and started emotionally manipulating Adam Susan with mind games. Consequently, Susan, who has formed a bizarre romantic attachment to the computer, begins to descend into madness.

Book 3: The Land of Do-As-You-Please
The following 5 November (1998), V blows up the Post Office Tower and Jordan Tower, killing "the Ear" leader Brian Etheridge, in addition to effectively shutting down three government agencies: the Eye, the Ear, and the Mouth. Creedy's men and Harper's associated street gangs violently suppress the subsequent wave of revolutionary fervor from the public. V notes to Evey that he has not yet achieved what he calls the "Land of Do-as-You-Please," meaning a functional anarchistic society, and considers the current chaotic situation an interim period of "Land of Take-What-You-Want." Finch has been mysteriously absent, and his young assistant, Dominic Stone, one day realises that V has been influencing the Fate computer all along, which explained V's consistent foresight. All the while, Finch has been traveling to the abandoned site of Larkhill, where he takes LSD to conjure up memories of his own devastating past and to put his mind in the role of a prisoner of Larkhill, like V, to help give him an intuitive understanding of V's experiences. Returning to London, Finch suddenly deduces that V's lair is inside the abandoned Victoria Station, which he enters.

V takes Finch by surprise, resulting in a scuffle that sees Finch shoot V, and V wounds Finch with a knife. V claims that he cannot be killed since he is only an idea and that "ideas are bulletproof"; regardless, V is indeed mortally wounded and returns to the Shadow Gallery deeper within, dying in Evey's arms. Evey considers unmasking V but decides not to, realizing that V is not an identity but a symbol. She then assumes V's identity, donning one of his spare costumes. Finch sees the large amount of blood that V has left in his wake and deduces that he has mortally wounded V. Occurring concurrently to this, Creedy has been pressuring Susan to appear in public, hoping to leave him exposed. Sure enough, as Susan stops to shake hands with Rose during a parade, she shoots him in the head in vengeance for the death of her husband and the life she has had to lead since then. Following Rose's arrest, Creedy assumes emergency leadership of the country, and Finch emerges from the subway proclaiming V's death.

Due to his LSD-induced epiphany, Finch leaves his position within "the Nose." The power struggle between the remaining leaders results in all of their deaths: Harper betrays and kills Creedy at the behest of Helen Heyer (wife of "the Eye" leader Conrad Heyer, who had outbid Creedy for Harper's loyalty), and Harper and Conrad Heyer kill each other during a fight precipitated by Heyer's discovery that his wife Helen had had an affair with Harper.

With the fate of the top government officials unknown to the public, Stone acts as leader of the police forces deployed to ensure that the riots are contained should V remain alive and make his promised public announcement. Evey appears to a crowd, dressed as V, announcing the destruction of 10 Downing Street the following day and telling the crowd they must "...choose what comes next. Lives of your own, or a return to chains", whereupon a general insurrection begins. Evey destroys 10 Downing Street by blowing up an Underground train containing V's body, in the style of an explosive Viking funeral. She abducts Stone, apparently to train him as her successor to make sure people like Susan will never hold power ever again. The book ends with Finch quietly observing the chaos raging in the city and walking down an abandoned motorway whose lights have all gone out.

Norsefire government

The highest-level officials in the Norsefire government form a council known as "The Head." The five individual departments are named after sensory organs or appendages that reference their functions.

Notes

Themes and motifs
The two conflicting political viewpoints of anarchism and fascism dominate the story.

Moore stated in an interview that V is designed as an enigma, as Moore "didn't want to tell people what to think" but wanted them to consider some extreme events that have recurred throughout history.

Adaptations

Film

In December 2005 Warner Bros. released a feature-film adaptation of V for Vendetta, directed by James McTeigue from a screenplay by the Wachowskis. Natalie Portman stars as Evey Hammond and Hugo Weaving (replacing James Purefoy) as V.

Alan Moore distanced himself from the film, as he has with other screen adaptations of his works. He ended co-operation with his publisher, DC Comics, after its corporate parent, Warner Bros., failed to retract statements about Moore's supposed endorsement of the movie.

After reading the script, Moore remarked:

He later adds that if the Wachowskis had wanted to protest about what was going on in the United States, then they should have used a political narrative that directly addressed the issues of the US, similar to what Moore had done before with Britain. The film arguably changes the original message by having removed any reference to actual anarchism in the revolutionary actions of V. An interview with producer Joel Silver reveals that he identifies the V of the comics as a clear-cut "superhero... a masked avenger who pretty much saves the world", a simplification that goes against Moore's own statements about V's role in the story.

Co-author and illustrator David Lloyd, by contrast, embraced the adaptation. In an interview with Newsarama he states:

Steve Moore (no relation to Alan Moore) wrote a novelisation of the film's screenplay, published in 2006.

Television

On 4 October 2017, it was announced that Channel 4 was developing a television series based on the V for Vendetta comic book, which ultimately entered development hell. On 29 July 2019, the day following the series premiere of Pennyworth, previously presented ostensibly as solely a direct prequel to Fox series Gotham (2014–2019), series co-showrunner Danny Cannon confirmed that Pennyworth would also serve as a loose prequel to V for Vendetta, with the British Civil War depicted in the series' first season eventually leading to the formation of the Norsefire government of V for Vendetta, a sentiment echoed by co-showrunner Bruno Heller on 11 December 2020, on the day of the second season premiere, and again on 5 February 2021, in the lead-up to the mid-season premiere. Characters wearing V's Guy Fawkes mask were later introduced in the series' 2022 third season, set five years after the first two seasons.

Legacy
The February 1999 issue of The Comics Journal ran a poll on "The Top 100 (English-Language) Comics of the Century": V for Vendetta reached 83rd place.

On 5 November 2019, the BBC News listed V for Vendetta on its list of the 100 most influential novels.

Cultural impact

Since the film adaptation, hundreds of thousands of Guy Fawkes masks from the books and film have been sold every year since the film's release in 2005. Time Warner owns the rights to the image and is paid a fee with the sale of each official mask.

Anonymous, an Internet-based group, has adopted the Guy Fawkes mask as their symbol (in reference to an Internet meme). Members, and supporters, wore such masks, for example, during Project Chanology's protests against the Church of Scientology in 2008. Although V for Vendetta did not pioneer the mask, only popularizing it, the link to the movie remained so strong, it prompted Alan Moore to comment on their use in an interview with Entertainment Weekly:

According to Time in 2011, the protesters' adoption of the mask led to it becoming the top-selling mask on Amazon, selling hundreds of thousands a year.

The film allegedly inspired some of the Egyptian youth before and during the 2011 Egyptian revolution.

On 23 May 2009, protesters dressed up as V and set off a fake barrel of gunpowder outside Parliament while protesting over the issue of British MPs' expenses.

During the Occupy Wall Street and other Occupy protests, the mask appeared internationally as a symbol of popular revolution. Artist David Lloyd stated: "The Guy Fawkes mask has now become a common brand and a convenient placard to use in protest against tyranny – and I'm happy with people using it, it seems quite unique, an icon of popular culture being used this way."

On 17 November 2012, police officials in Dubai warned against wearing Guy Fawkes masks painted with the colours of the UAE flag during any celebration associated with the UAE National Day (2 December), declaring such use an illegal act after masks went on sale in online shops for 50 DHS.

Guy Fawkes masks also made an appearance in the 2014 Hong Kong protests and also in 2019.

See also
 Watchmen
 Anarky

Notes and references

Bibliography

Further reading

External links

 V for Vendetta official site  at DC Comics (page discontinued)
 V for Vendetta: Comic vs. Film at IGN
 An Annotation of Literary, Historic and Artistic References in Alan Moore's Graphic Novel, V For Vendetta by Madelyn Boudreaux
 V for Vendetta – The Ultimate Collection Website fan site
 Interview with the British man who designed the Anonymous (V for Vendetta) mask, what he thinks of how it’s being used by PostDesk
 readable comics @ archive.org

 
Occupy Wall Street
1982 comics debuts
1989 comics endings
Fiction set in 1997
Fiction set in 1998
Comics set in the 1990s
Comics set in the United Kingdom
Drama comics
Anarchist fiction
Comics by Alan Moore
British comics titles
Dystopian comics
Fiction about government
Post-apocalyptic comics
Vertigo Comics limited series
Vertigo Comics titles
Human experimentation in fiction
British novels adapted into films
British comics adapted into films
Works about rebels
Works about rebellions
Fiction about rebellions
Genocide in fiction
Comics set in London
Anti-fascist books